Bahía Honda is a municipality and town in the Artemisa Province of Cuba. Before 2011, the municipality belonged to Pinar del Río Province.

Overview
The sheltered bay that gives the name to the municipality contains an industrial port. It marks the eastern extend of the Colorados Archipelago.

Bahía Honda was once one of the naval bases leased to the United States under the Platt Amendment, but abandoned in 1912 in turn for an expansion of the area leased around Guantánamo Bay.

Demographics
In 2004, the municipality of Bahía Honda had a population of 45,968.

Climate
This area  typically has a pronounced dry season, but average monthly precipitation does not get lower than 68 mm (in March) in Bahía Honda, making this a more humid locality than many others in the region.  According to the Köppen Climate Classification system, Bahía Honda, Cuba has a tropical rainforest climate, abbreviated "Af" on climate maps.

See also
Municipalities of Cuba
List of cities in Cuba
Bahía Honda Municipal Museum

References

External links

Populated places in Artemisa Province
Port cities and towns in Cuba